Sorbus lanata, or hairy rowan, is a species of rowan deciduous tree of the family Rosaceae. It is a rose plant species which was first described by David Don, and got its current name from Johannes Conrad Schauer. No subspecies are listed in the Catalog of Life.

S. lanata is a fruit bearing tree that flowers in May. It can grow in loamy, sandy and clay soils. S. lanata can grow in complete sunlight or semi-shaded areas. It can withstand high wind speeds, but not much of other harsh conditions. The plant is sometimes grown as an ornamental plant in stone gardens, parks and yards.

Fruit 
The fruit of S. lanata has a tropical taste and grows in bunches. The fruits measure between 1 and 3 cm in diameter. The seeds of this fruit contain trace amounts of hydrogen cyanide. This is not much of a problem because there is only a very small amount in the seeds. There are no known medicinal properties of S. lanata and its fruit.

Distribution 
S. lanata plants are found in the northern hemisphere. They grow in cooler areas. Most of the species is found in Eastern China and the Himalayas. A large amount of them is also found in high grazing pastures of the United Kingdom and Ireland.

References

lanata
Trees of China
Flora of East Himalaya